Berthold Englisch (9 July 1851, Hotzenplotz – 19 October 1897, Vienna) was a leading Austrian chess master.

Englisch was born in Austrian Silesia (then Austria-Hungary) into a Jewish family. He earned his living as a stock-market agent.

He won the tournaments at Leipzig 1879 (the 1st DSB Congress), at Wiesbaden 1880 (ex-equo with Blackburne and A. Schwarz, ahead of Schallopp, Mason, Bird, Winawer, etc.) and at Vienna 1896 (Quadrangular).

He lost two matches against Vincenz Hruby in 1882 and to Emanuel Lasker in 1890, both scoring 1.5 : 3.5, and drew a match with Harry Nelson Pillsbury 2.5 : 2.5 (+0 –0 =5) in 1896, all in Vienna.

References

See also
 List of Jewish chess players

External links 
 

1851 births
1897 deaths
Austrian Jews
People from Bruntál District
Austrian chess players
Jewish chess players
People from Austrian Silesia
19th-century chess players